This is a list of members of the Australian Senate from 1923 to 1926. Half of its members were elected at the 13 December 1919 election and had terms starting on 1 July 1920 and finishing on 30 June 1926; the other half were elected at the 16 December 1922 election and had terms starting on 1 July 1923 and finishing on 30 June 1929.

This period was marked by the number of casual vacancies and the filling of these vacancies was complex. While senators were elected for a six-year term, people appointed to a casual vacancy only held office until the earlier of the next election for the House of Representatives or the Senate. Because the 1925 election was a half senate election, each state would ordinarily elect 3 senators.  NSW however had 2 additional vacancies as a result of the death of 2 senators with terms ending in 1929. The first three elected, Cox, Duncan and Massy-Greene won the full term from 1 July 1926 to 30 June 1932, while the next two elected Abbott and Thomas won the long vacancies finishing on 30 June 1929. Massy-Greene who had been appointed to fill one of the vacancies in 1923 ceased to be a senator between 14 November 1925 and the start of his new term on 1 July 1926. Victoria had 1 additional vacancy, a short vacancy with the term ending in 1926. Plain was the third senator elected and thus won both the short vacancy ending on 30 June 1926 and the full term from 1 July 1926 to 30 June 1932.

Notes

References

Members of Australian parliaments by term
20th-century Australian politicians
Australian Senate lists